Mr. Music is an album by saxophonist and arranger Al Cohn recorded in late 1954 for the RCA Victor label.

Reception

Allmusic awarded the album 2 stars.

Track listing
 "Something for Lisa" (Al Cohn) - 6:29
 "Count Every Star" (Bruno Coquatrix, Sammy Gallop) - 3:09
 "Cabin in the Sky" (Vernon Duke, John La Touche) - 3:06
 "Move" (Denzil Best) - 7:19
 "Never Never Land" (Jule Styne, Betty Comden, Adolph Green) - 5:30
 "La Ronde" (Oscar Straus, Dorcas Cochran) - 2:47
 "This Reminds Me of You" (Ralph Burns) - 3:16
 "Breakfast with Joe" (Johnny Carisi) - 4:09
 "Cohn My Way" (Manny Albam) - 2:55

Personnel 
Al Cohn - tenor saxophone
Joe Newman - trumpet
Billy Byers, Frank Rehak (tracks 1, 2 & 4-6) - trombone
Hal McKusick (tracks 1, 2 & 4-6), Gene Quill - alto saxophone
Sol Schlinger - baritone saxophone
Sanford Gold - piano
Billy Bauer (tracks 4 & 5), Sir Osbert Haberdasher (pseudonym for Jimmy Raney, tracks 1, 2 & 6) - guitar
Buddy Jones (tracks 3 & 7-9), Milt Hinton (tracks 1, 2 & 4-6) - bass
Osie Johnson - drums 
Manny Albam (track 9), Ralph Burns (track 7), Johnny Carisi (track 8), Al Cohn (tracks 1-6) - arranger

References 

1955 albums
RCA Records albums
Al Cohn albums
Albums arranged by Manny Albam
Albums arranged by Ralph Burns